Southern Railway 722 is a class "Ks-1" 2-8-0 "Consolidation" type steam locomotive built in September 1904 by the Baldwin Locomotive Works to run on the Murphy Branch, where it hauled freight trains between Asheville and Murphy, North Carolina for the Southern Railway (SOU). In 1952, it was purchased by the East Tennessee and Western North Carolina Railroad (ET&WNC), alongside its sister locomotive No. 630, where they were served as switchers around Johnson City and Elizabethton, Tennessee.

In 1967, Nos. 722 and 630 were both traded back to the SOU for use in their steam excursion program until 1980, when they were sent to the Tennessee Valley Railroad Museum (TVRM) in Chattanooga, Tennessee to make way for larger steam locomotives haul the longer and heavier excursion trains. In 1985, No. 722 was taken out of service and was eventually purchased by the Great Smoky Mountains Railroad (GSMR) in 2000, where it was currently disassembled, awaiting to be restored to operating condition.

History

Revenue service
The No. 722 locomotive was assigned to work on the Southern Railway's Murphy Branch, where it was primarily used to haul freight trains between Asheville and Murphy, North Carolina. In August 1952, No. 722 was retired from revenue service after it pulled the last steam-powered freight train on the Murphy Branch. Three months later, No. 722 and sister locomotive No. 630 were both purchased by the East Tennessee and Western North Carolina Railroad (ET&WNC), where they were served as switchers in Johnson City and Elizabethton, Tennessee. After ET&WNC's acquirement, Nos. 722 and 630 were renumbered to Nos. 208 and 207, respectively, while their tender coal bunker were cut down to give the engineer a clear view during numerous switching moves and reverse operation. In 1962, No. 208 traveled to Knoxville, Tennessee, where it was filmed in a cameo appearance for the 1963 film All the Way Home.

Excursion service
On December 8, 1967, No. 208 (No. 722) and No. 207 (No. 630) were both traded back to the Southern Railway for use in their steam excursion program in return for a pair of former Central of Georgia ALCO RS-3s. While they retrieved their old numbers, No. 722 had a cracked firebox, but No. 630 was in better condition, and has been given minor repairs as it began excursion service in February 1968.

Two years later, No. 722 had its firebox repaired and a brand new paint scheme of Southern's Virginian green with gold linings to match the fellow excursion locomotive No. 4501. The No. 722 locomotive made its first public excursion debut in September 1970 with Nos. 630 and 4501 for the National Railway Historical Society (NRHS) convention in Charleston, South Carolina.

In May 1979, Southern loaned No. 722 to the Wilmington and Western Railroad (WWRC) to operate on their Wilmington and Northern Branch line in Wilmington, Delaware. In September 1980, Southern loaned the locomotive again to the Tennessee Valley Railroad Museum (TVRM) in Chattanooga, Tennessee along with No. 630 to make way for larger superpower steam locomotives such as Canadian Pacific 2839, Texas and Pacific 610 and Chesapeake and Ohio 2716 to pull SOU's longer and heavier excursions.

Disposition

In November 1985, No. 722 was retired due to its boiler ticket certificate and sat on display at TVRM. In 1992, the locomotive was moved to Asheville, North Carolina by Southern's successor, Norfolk Southern (NS) to be on display at the city's Biltmore section. In late 1999, NS has sold the Biltmore property for redevelopment and removed No. 722 from its display site to the Asheville roundhouse for storage.

In late 2000, the Great Smoky Mountains Railroad (GSMR), which operates the same Murphy Branch where No. 722 was used in revenue service, purchased the locomotive with the hopes of restoring it to operating condition. However, when No. 722 was being disassembled for restoration work, the plans were halted due to GSMR's other steam locomotive ex-U.S. Army No. 1702 went out of service in 2005, leaving them both remaining disassembled outside the GSMR's workshop area in Dillsboro, North Carolina, exposed to the elements. 

In 2012, GSMR announced their plan to restore both Nos. 1702 and 722 to operating condition with the restoration cost estimated at $700,000 for each locomotives. In 2017, a year after No. 1702 was restored back to service, GSMR stated that they were still determined to rebuild the No. 722 locomotive from the ground up, depending on its current condition.

See also
 McCloud Railway 25
 Polson Logging Co. 2
 Southern Railway 154
 Southern Railway 385
 Southern Railway 401
 W. Graham Claytor Jr.

Notes

References

Bibliography

External links

Great Smoky Mountains Railroad website

Individual locomotives of the United States
2-8-0 locomotives
Steam locomotives of Southern Railway (U.S.)
Baldwin locomotives
Railway locomotives introduced in 1904
Standard gauge locomotives of the United States
Preserved steam locomotives of North Carolina